Nils Jönsson i Rossbol  (1893–1957) was a Swedish politician. He was a member of the Centre Party.

References
This article was initially translated from the Swedish Wikipedia article.

Centre Party (Sweden) politicians
1893 births
1957 deaths